The Kyrgyz-Gava Botanical Reserve (also Кыргызкаба Kyrgyzkaba) is located in Bazar-Korgon District of Jalal-Abad Region of Kyrgyzstan. It was established in 1975 with a purpose of conservation of endemic Juno magnifica. The botanical reserve occupies 50 hectares. It is located near the village Sary-Jayyk (formerly Kyrgyzkaba).

References

Botanical reserves in Kyrgyzstan
Protected areas established in 1975